MT-RNR2-like 4 is a protein that in humans is encoded by the MTRNR2L4 gene.

References

Further reading